Rhodamine B  is a chemical compound and a dye. It is often used as a tracer dye within water to determine the rate and direction of flow and transport. Rhodamine dyes fluoresce and can thus be detected easily and inexpensively with fluorometers.

Rhodamine B is used in biology as a staining fluorescent dye, sometimes in combination with auramine O, as the auramine-rhodamine stain to demonstrate acid-fast organisms, notably Mycobacterium. Rhodamine dyes are also used extensively in biotechnology applications such as fluorescence microscopy, flow cytometry, fluorescence correlation spectroscopy and ELISA. It is also used in rose milk, a popular Indian beverage.

Other uses

Rhodamine B is often mixed with herbicides to show where they have been used.

It is also being tested for use as a biomarker in oral rabies vaccines for wildlife, such as raccoons, to identify animals that have eaten a vaccine bait. The rhodamine is incorporated into the animal's whiskers and teeth.

Rhodamine B (BV10) is mixed with quinacridone magenta (PR122) to make the bright pink watercolor known as Opera Rose.

Properties 

Rhodamine B can exist in equilibrium between two forms: an "open"/fluorescent form and a "closed"/nonfluorescent spirolactone form. The "open" form dominates in acidic condition while the "closed" form is colorless in basic condition.

The fluorescence intensity of rhodamine B will decrease as temperature increases.

The solubility of rhodamine B in water varies by manufacturer, and has been reported as 8 g/L and ~15 g/L, while solubility in alcohol (presumably ethanol) has been reported as 15 g/L. Chlorinated tap water decomposes rhodamine B. Rhodamine B solutions adsorb to plastics and should be kept in glass.
Rhodamine B is tunable around 610 nm when used as a laser dye. Its luminescence quantum yield is 0.65 in basic ethanol, 0.49 in ethanol, 1.0, and 0.68 in 94% ethanol. The fluorescence yield is temperature dependent; the compound is fluxional in that its excitability is in thermal equilibrium at room temperature.

Safety and health
In California, rhodamine B is suspected to be carcinogenic and thus products containing it must contain a warning on its label. Cases of economically motivated adulteration, where it has been illegally used to impart a red color to chili powder, have come to the attention of food safety regulators.

See also 
Dye laser
Laser dyes
Rhodamine
Rhodamine 6G

References

Notes 

Microscopy
Microbiology techniques
Laboratory techniques
Histopathology
Histotechnology
Staining dyes
Staining

Laser gain media
Benzoic acids
Aromatic amines
Chlorides
Quaternary ammonium compounds
Triarylmethane dyes
Xanthenes
Diethylamino compounds
Fluorescent dyes